Marc Alcalá Ibáñez (born 7 November 1994 in Barcelona) is a Spanish middle-distance runner who specialises in the 1500 metres. He represented his country at the 2016 World Indoor Championships narrowly missing the final. In addition, he won the gold medal at the 2015 European U23 Championships.

Competition record

Personal bests
Outdoor
1000 metres – 2:19.41 (Barcelona 2015)
1500 metres – 3:35.85 (Monaco 2017)
Indoor
1000 metres – 2:20.45 (Stockholm 2016)
1500 metres – 3:39.33 (Sabadell 2016)
3000 metres – 7:58.28 (Sabadell 2016)

References

1994 births
Living people
Athletes from Barcelona
Spanish male middle-distance runners
World Athletics Championships athletes for Spain
Athletes (track and field) at the 2018 Mediterranean Games
Mediterranean Games competitors for Spain
21st-century Spanish people